Vincetoxicum diplostigma is a species of plants in the family Apocynaceae. It was originally described in 1895 as Diplostigma canescens, the only species in the genus Diplostigma. It is native to parts of eastern Africa (Djibouti, Ethiopia, Kenya, Tanzania and Uganda) and to Saudi Arabia.

References

Flora of Djibouti
Flora of Ethiopia
Flora of Kenya
Flora of Tanzania
Flora of Uganda
Flora of Saudi Arabia
diplostigma